The Brandt Hotel, located at 400 Missouri St in Alma, Kansas, was built in 1887.  It was listed on the National Register of Historic Places in 2008.  It has also been known as the Alma Hotel.

It is a two-story late Italianate-style commercial block building with a parapet.  Italianate features include its "ornamental pressed metal eave cornice and the coursed smooth-cut stone blocks accentuating
the corner entrance."

References

Hotel buildings on the National Register of Historic Places in Kansas
Italianate architecture in Kansas
Commercial buildings completed in 1887
Wabaunsee County, Kansas
Hotels in Kansas